Orthetrum nitidinerve, also known as Orthetrum baeticum is a freshwater Mediterranean dragonfly species. The common name for this species is Yellow-Veined Skimmer. Its natural egg clutches count for an average of 970.

See also 
 Orthetrum

References 

Insects described in 1841
Libellulidae